This is a list of federal subjects of Russia with the corresponding Unemployment Rate. All figures are from the Russian Statistical Bureau.

External links
 Уровень безработицы (по методологии МОТ) - Unemployment rate (ILO methodology) - Fedstat

Unemployment
Unemployment
Unemployment in Russia
Russia, unemployment rate